Atabae, officially Atabae Administrative Post, is an administrative post (and was formerly a subdistrict) in Bobonaro municipality, East Timor. Its population at the 2010 census was 10,976.

The real village of Atabae is in the suco of Rairobo.

References

External links 

  – information page on Ministry of State Administration site 

Administrative posts of East Timor
Bobonaro Municipality